Ko Bongisa Mutu is a 2002 documentary film directed by Claude Haffner.

Synopsis 
Plagued by the stress of Paris, a young woman from Congo-Kinshasa takes shelter in a hair salon in the Strasbourg-Saint-Denis neighborhood in Paris, where numerous African hairdressers have opened up for business. She spends a very enjoyable day watching the clients being taken care of, eating, singing and even dancing. She recovers memories from her childhood and a certain amount of serenity.

References

External links 
 El Festival de Cine Africano
 Arts Ghana

2002 films
Creative Commons-licensed documentary films
Democratic Republic of the Congo short documentary films
2002 short documentary films